Edward Oliver Wolcott (March 26, 1848 – March 1, 1905) was an American politician during the 1890s, who served for 12 years as a Senator from the state of Colorado.

Early life
Wolcott was born on March 26, 1848, in Longmeadow, Massachusetts. He was one of eleven children born to Harriet Amanda ( Pope) Wolcott and Samuel Wolcott, D.D., a Congregationalist minister, missionary, and writer of hymns. Among his siblings was Anna Wolcott Vaile, an educator who established the Wolcott School for Girls. A native of Hampden County, Massachusetts, Wolcott moved to Ohio as a boy.

He was a descendant of Oliver Wolcott, signer of the United States Declaration of Independence. He graduated from Yale College before attending Harvard Law School, from where he graduated in 1875.

Career 
He served in the 150th Ohio Volunteer Infantry during the American Civil War. He enlisted at age 16.

Legal and political career

After graduating from Harvard Law School in 1875, he moved to Colorado where he set up a law practice. In the late 1890s and early 1900s, one of the partners in his practice was Charles W. Waterman, later a United States senator.

From 1876 to 1879 he served as a district attorney in Colorado. In 1879, Wolcott moved to Denver, where he began his political career as a Colorado state senator (1879–1882). In 1889, he was chosen to represent Colorado in the U.S. Senate, as a member of the Republican Party. When he entered Congress, he was the youngest member of the Senate. He was reelected in 1895, and was an unsuccessful candidate for reelection in 1901, 1902 and 1903.

While in Washington, D.C., Wolcott was a leading advocate for the coinage of silver. In 1897, President McKinley named him chairman of the commission sent to Europe to report on international bimetallism. He was a popular host and guest in Washington society. He was chairman of the Committee on Civil Service and Retrenchment (51st and 52nd Congresses), and the Committee on Post Office and Post Roads (54th through 56th Congresses).

In 1900, Wolcott was denied renomination to the Senate, which ended his political career. He once again took up the practice of law in Colorado, and maintained that practice until his death.

Personal life
In 1890, Wolcott was married to Frances Esther (née Metcalfe) Bass (1851–1933) by The Rev. Francis Lobdell at St. Paul's Cathedral in Buffalo, New York. Frances, the widow of U.S. Representative Lyman K. Bass, was the daughter of James Harvey Metcalfe and Erzelia Frances ( Stetson) Metcalfe of Buffalo. From her first marriage, she was the mother of Lyman M. Bass, the U.S. Attorney for the Western District of New York. They later divorced in 1899.

Wolcott died on March 1, 1905, while he was on vacation in Monte Carlo. Wolcott's remains were cremated in Paris, and the ashes were interred at Woodlawn Cemetery in New York City.

Legacy
The town of Wolcott in Eagle County, Colorado, is named after him. It was originally known as Bussells, but was changed to Wolcott in his honor.

References

External links

1848 births
1905 deaths
People from Longmeadow, Massachusetts
Republican Party United States senators from Colorado
Republican Party Colorado state senators
Colorado lawyers
Union Army soldiers
People of Ohio in the American Civil War
Politicians from Denver
Harvard Law School alumni
19th-century American politicians
20th-century American lawyers
19th-century American lawyers